On 19 January 2006 an Antonov An-24 aircraft operated by the Slovak Air Force crashed in northern Hungary, near the village of Hejce and town of Telkibánya. The airplane was carrying Slovak peacekeepers from Kosovo. Of the 43 people on board, only one survived. The crash remains the deadliest in Hungarian and Slovak history.

Background 
The airplane involved in the crash was an Antonov An-24V, the 50-seat version of the Antonov An-24, a twin turboprop transport aircraft. The aircraft was manufactured on 31 October 1969 in the Soviet Union with the serial number 97305605.

The airplane was carrying Slovak peacekeepers who had finished a six-month tour of duty in NATO's KFOR mission in Kosovo. The airplane was flying from Pristina International Airport in Pristina, Kosovo to Košice International Airport in Košice, Slovakia.

Crash 
At around 19:38 CET (18:38 GMT), the aircraft disappeared from air traffic controllers' radar screens. The aircraft crashed in snowy and forested terrain on Borsó Hill at an elevation of 700 meters (2,300 feet) near the Hungarian village of Hejce and the village of Telkibánya.

According to the Hungarian Disaster Management Agency, the plane hit the tops of trees before catching fire and crashing.

Emergency response 
Emergency workers who arrived at the scene were tasked not only with looking for survivors, but also with putting out the fire at the crash site. Hungarian authorities reported that the heavily wooded and steep terrain, as well as the low temperatures, contributed to the destruction and hampered rescue efforts. It was also reported that helicopters were unable to land at the crash site. Access was also made difficult because the road leading to the site was covered in snow.

Michaela Farkasova, the wife of the sole surviving passenger, reported that she received a cellular telephone call from her husband, Martin Farkaš. She said that she received the call around 19:30 CET (18:30 GMT). She is quoted as saying that her husband told her that his plane had crashed in a forest. Shortly before the line went dead, he asked her to alert rescue services and the police.

Sole survivor 
The sole survivor of the crash was Slovak Army First Lieutenant Martin Farkaš. He suffered minor brain swelling and lung injuries in the crash and was transported to Košice for further treatment afterwards. He was put into a medically induced coma, but he was soon reported to be in a stable condition.

According to rescuers, his survival was pure luck as he was found in the aircraft's lavatory, which received little damage.

Reactions and aftermath 

United States Ambassador to Slovakia Rodolphe Vallee released a statement on 30 January expressing his condolences to the families and friends of the victims, to the Slovak Armed Forces, and to the Slovak Republic. Secretary General of NATO Jaap de Hoop Scheffer issued a statement hours after the incident in which he expressed his condolences.

Memorials 

Immediately after the crash, flags were lowered to half-staff and sirens sounded as a tribute to the victims.

On 30 March 2006, the United States Army Major General R. Martin Umbarger, Commanding General for the Indiana Army National Guard, presented a memorial to Slovak Army Major General Peter Gajdoš at a ceremony at the Slovak Ministry of Defense building in Bratislava. On 27 March the memorial travelled to Prešov and on 29 March to Trebišov before returning to Bratislava.

On 18 September 2006, the government of Slovakia allocated 1.5 million koruna from its reserve fund to build a memorial in the Hungarian village of Hejce, near the crash site. The Defence Ministry of Slovakia was able to raise 1.496 million koruna through fundraising. The Slovak Cabinet committed to match public donations and earmarked 1.5 million koruna. The memorial cost around 4.5 million koruna.

On 19 January 2007, the first anniversary of the crash was commemorated by the victims' loved ones, Martin Farkaš and his wife, and the Slovak and Hungarian militaries. Among those attending was Slovak Defence Minister František Kašický, Slovak Army Chief of Staff Ľubomír Bulík, Hungarian Defence State Secretary József Bali, and Hungarian Deputy Army Chief of Staff János Mikita. The attendees laid wreaths and flowers and lit candles at the crash site. Also in the ceremony, Slovak and Hungarian clergy blessed the cornerstone of a monument to the victims that will be near a local church in the Hungarian village of Hejce.

Investigation 

The investigation indicates that the pilot descended too early in the dark towards the lights of Košice.

See also 
 List of sole survivors of aviation accidents and incidents

References

External links 

Pre-accident pictures of the aircraft
Links to pictures of the crash

2006 in Slovakia
2006 in Hungary
Aviation accidents and incidents involving controlled flight into terrain
Aviation accidents and incidents in 2006
Aviation accidents and incidents in Hungary
Accidents and incidents involving the Antonov An-24
Aviation accidents and incidents in Slovakia
Aviation accidents and incidents caused by pilot error
2006
2006
Accidents and incidents involving military aircraft
January 2006 events in Europe
2006 disasters in Hungary